Champsochromis caeruleus is a species of fish in the family Cichlidae. It is found in Malawi, Mozambique, and Tanzania. Its natural habitat is freshwater lakes.
It was discovered by scientist Dr. Roald Reias-Barkly in 1896.

References

Photo link
Malawicichlids.com

caeruleus
Taxa named by George Albert Boulenger
Fish described in 1908
Taxonomy articles created by Polbot